The Canadian Party of Quebec is a provincial political party in Quebec. It promotes anglophone language rights and bilingualism, with a main focus on abolishing Bill 96 and the Act respecting the laicity of the State. The party ran candidates during the 2022 Quebec general election.

Policies
On its website, the party claims that it supports minority rights, indigenous rights, linguistic rights, bilingualism, religious freedom and Canadian national unity.

See also
Equality Party
Bloc Montreal

References

External links
Official website - Canadian Party of Quebec

2022 establishments in Quebec
Political parties of minorities
Political parties established in 2022
Quebec Anglophone culture
Provincial political parties in Quebec